The Khiamniungan people, also known as the Khiamniungan Naga, are a Tibeto-Burmese ethnic group, with approximately 35% of the population inhabiting in Noklak District in the Northeast Indian state of Nagaland and the rest in Naga Self Administered Zone and Hkhamti district of Myanmar. They were also called Kalyo-Kengnyu ("slate-house dwellers") during the British Raj.

History 

The origin of the Khiamniungans remains uncertain. There are no written records of their history before the British Raj days. However, the only source of information about their ancestors are oral traditions in the form of folktales and myths.

According to a popular myth, Khiamniungan means "source of great waters" - the place from where the early ancestors of Khiamniungan are said to have originated. This place is identified near Lengnyu-Tsuwao villages, under Pathso Range, over looking from the present day Noklak and Pathso towns.

Today, the Khiamniungans occupy the easternmost part of India and northwestern part of Myanmar. In India, they are mostly found in Noklak district of Nagaland state and the rest in Naga Self Administered Zone and Hkhamti district of Saigaing Division, Myanmar. The mighty Chindwin river flows through the land of Khiamniungans.They are linked linguistically as well as culturally to the Tibeto-Burman.

During the British Raj, the Khiamniungans were referred to as "kalyo Kenyu", particularly in the works of anthropologists such as Christoph von Fürer-Haimendorf. Unlike several other Naga people, the advent of Christianity had little impact on the Khiamniungan for a long time, due to their remote location. The first Khiamniungan to convert to Christianity was Khaming, in 1947. Thereafter, a number of Khiamniungans converted to Christianity. After the coming of the new education system, social system, modernization and Christianity, there have been drastic changes in their social life.

society of the ethnic group

The traditional Khiamniungan village had eight important people:

 Nokpao or Nyokpao (war leader)
 Puthsee or petchi (peace maker, elder)
 Ampao, Meyo, meya (priest)
 Kieo lomei        (doctor)
 Ain               (priestess and oracle)
 Shoalang or sonlan (blacksmith)
 Paothieo or paothai (story teller)
 Ainloom (the keeper of the a supposedly magical stone; the stone is said to warn of any impending disaster such as a fire or a raid, by moving out of its basket or by creating a sound through striking another object)

By the early 1990s, only the Puthsee, the Shoalang and the Ainloom remained relevant, others being remembered mainly as part of books and oral tradition.

Culture 
The traditional Khiamniungan attires consist of bright red and bright deep blue colored dresses. The ornaments are made of cowries and conch shells.

The ethnic musical instruments include drums made of gourds and bamboo flutes.

Festivals

Miu 
The Khiamniungan people, who traditionally practised jhum cultivation (slash and burn agriculture), celebrate the Miu festival at the time of sowing. They offer prayers for a good harvest.

Tsoküm 
Tsoküm is the week-long harvest festival of the ethnic group, celebrated in October. The festival includes dancing, singing, cleaning, repair of the roads, and outdoor cooking and eating. In this festival the people invoke god's blessing for a bountiful harvest.

References 

Naga people